Elvio is a given name. Notable people with the name include:

 Elvio Banchero (1904–1982), Italian football player
 Elvio Jiménez (born 1940), Dominican baseball player
 Elvio Martínez (born 1982), Argentine football player
 Elvio van Overbeek (born 1994), Angolan-born Dutch football player
 Elvio Mana (born 1955), Argentine football player
 Elvio Porcel de Peralta, Argentine football player
 Elvio Porta (1945–2016), Italian actor
 Elvio Romero (1926–2004), Paraguayan poet
 Elvio Sadun (1918–1974), Italian-born American parasitologist
 Elvio Salvori (born 1944), Italian football player

Italian masculine given names